Mercedes Mason (formerly Masöhn; born 1982/1983) is a Swedish-born American actress and former model. She is known for playing the role of Zondra in the television series Chuck, and as Isabel Zambada in the procedural drama The Finder. She also starred in the 2011 American horror film Quarantine 2: Terminal, portrayed Louise Leonard in the supernatural drama series 666 Park Avenue (2012–2013), Talia Del Campo in NCIS: Los Angeles, and was a regular on AMC's television series Fear the Walking Dead from 2015 to 2017.

Early life
Mason was born in Linköping, Sweden, and grew up in the neighborhood of Ryd, Linköping. Her family had emigrated from Iran. She has one sister. She moved to the United States with her family at the age of 12 and was raised around the Chicago area.

Career
Mason started her career as Mercedes Masöhn on television with a minor one-episode role in the daytime soap opera One Life to Live in 2005; she returned to the series for two episodes in 2006 as the character Neery. From 2008 to 2011, Mason had various one-episode appearances in series such as NCIS, CSI:NY and Castle. She had her main role debut in film as Jenny of Quarantine 2: Terminal, the 2011 found footage horror movie sequel to Quarantine. Prior to that, she appeared in minor roles in The Break-Up (2006) and Red Sands (2009). In 2011, she also starred in the drama film Three Veils. Throughout the following years, Mason took part in various movies in minor or supporting roles.

In 2012, Mason was one of two lead actresses in The Finder during its lone season. She played Deputy U.S. Marshal Isabel Zambada, the romantic interest of title character Walter Sherman (Geoff Stults). Both she and Maddie Hasson filled the void left by the departure of Saffron Burrows, the female lead in the series' backdoor pilot which was the 19th episode of Season 6 of Bones. She also co-starred on the ABC supernatural drama series 666 Park Avenue in 2012, which was canceled midway through its season.

In spring 2014, she debuted her role of DEA Special Agent Talia Del Campo on the CBS series NCIS: Los Angeles, which has since become a recurring role, appearing in seven episodes from 2014 to 2022. In August 2015, Mason debuted in her role as Ofelia Salazar, on the Walking Dead companion series Fear the Walking Dead. In 2018, she played the role of Captain Zoe Andersen in the first season of the ABC series The Rookie.

Personal life
Mason married David Denman in September 2014. Their first child was born on 10 January 2018, a son named Caius Kane. Their second child, Sagan Cyrus, was born in May 2021. Mason came out as bisexual in December 2019.

Mason is a naturalized U.S. citizen, having taken the citizenship test in April 2016.

Mason speaks English, French, Spanish, and Persian; on the Swedish talk show Skavlan on 30 September 2016, she said that she no longer speaks Swedish but understands it.

Filmography

Film

Television

References

External links
 
 

Living people
Actresses from Illinois
People from Linköping
Swedish television actresses
Swedish expatriates in the United States
Naturalized citizens of the United States
American television actresses
Swedish people of Iranian descent
American people of Iranian descent
Year of birth missing (living people)
1980s births
Bisexual actresses
LGBT people from Illinois
American bisexual actors
Swedish LGBT actors